Henry Jackson (February 1, 1811 – July 31, 1857) was an American pioneer, businessman, and politician from Minnesota.

Biography
Born in Abingdon, Virginia, Jackson served in the Texas army under Sam Houston during the Texas Revolution. He moved to Green Bay, Wisconsin, then Galena, Illinois, where he opened a store. After some difficulties, he moved to Saint Paul, Minnesota and was the first merchant to settle there. He was also the first postmaster in Saint Paul and served on the Saint Paul Town Council. He was also appointed justice of the peace by Henry Dodge, Governor of Wisconsin Territory, for what is now St. Croix County, Wisconsin. From 1847 to 1848, Jackson served in the Wisconsin Territorial Legislature, serving in the Wisconsin Territorial House of Representatives, and in 1849 he was elected to the first Minnesota Territorial Legislature, serving in the Minnesota Territorial House of Representatives. In 1852, he helped found Mankato, Minnesota. Jackson County, Minnesota was named after him. He was a Democrat.

Notes

1811 births
1857 deaths
Politicians from Abingdon, Virginia
People from Galena, Illinois
Politicians from Saint Paul, Minnesota
Politicians from Mankato, Minnesota
Politicians from Green Bay, Wisconsin
People of the Texas Revolution
American city founders
Minnesota city council members
Members of the Minnesota Territorial Legislature
Members of the Wisconsin Territorial Legislature
Minnesota Democrats
Wisconsin Democrats
Minnesota postmasters
19th-century American politicians
American justices of the peace